Guélor Franck Nkela Nkatu (born 25 September 1984) is a Congolese footballer who plays as a goalkeeper.

Career
Nkela made two appearances in the Belgian First Division during the 2008–09 season for Mons.

In 2021, Nkela moved to Sint-Niklaas after having played a couple of seasons for Wallonia Walhain.

References 

1984 births
Living people
Democratic Republic of the Congo footballers
Democratic Republic of the Congo international footballers
Association football goalkeepers
Belgian people of Democratic Republic of the Congo descent
SC Cilu players
C.S. Visé players
R.A.E.C. Mons players
A.F.C. Tubize players
KFC Turnhout players
AS Vita Club players
R. Wallonia Walhain Chaumont-Gistoux players
Sportkring Sint-Niklaas players
Belgian Pro League players
Challenger Pro League players